Ali Asad Abbas, (born 6 December 1976) is a Pakistani-born cricketer who played for the United Arab Emirates national cricket team in 2 One Day Internationals.

External links 

1976 births
Living people
Emirati cricketers
United Arab Emirates One Day International cricketers
Pakistani emigrants to the United Arab Emirates
Pakistani expatriate sportspeople in the United Arab Emirates
Pakistani cricketers
Cricketers from Lahore
Lahore City cricketers